Roland Stocker (born 5 October 1956 in Switzerland) is a Swiss Australian biochemist who discovered the antioxidant activity of bilirubin. He is a former Olympic rower and has represented Switzerland at the 1980 Summer Olympics.

Early life and education
Stocker was awarded a Diplom [im] Naturwissenschaften und Mathematik (Dipl. Natw.), or Diploma in/of Natural Science, from the ETH Zurich in 1981 and a Ph.D. from the Australian National University in 1985.

Career
Stocker has made significant contributions to the understanding of the molecular action of Alpha-Tocopherol (vitamin E) during the oxidation of lipoproteins, the antioxidant activities of ubiquinol-10 in lipoproteins, the contribution of oxidation of low-density lipoprotein to atherosclerosis, the understanding of how antioxidants and heme oxygenase-1 protect against atherosclerosis, the role of myeloperoxidase to atherosclerotic plaque destabilization, and the contribution of tryptophan metabolism by indoleamine 2,3-dioxygenase in the regulation of vascular tone in inflammation.

Stocker is recognized as a "redox pioneer". He is a Fellow of the Swiss Academy of Medical Sciences and the Australian Academy of Health and Medical Sciences.

Formerly, Stocker held an appointment as a professor at the University of New South Wales and the University of Sydney, Australia. Currently, he is Group Leader at the Heart Research Institute.

Personal life
Stocker lives in Sydney, Australia with his wife, Maree Stenglin.

Stocker's twin brother, Peter, was also an Olympic rower for Switzerland.

References

External links
Professor Roland Stocker – Sydney Medical School – The University of Sydney

1956 births
Australian biochemists
Australian cardiovascular researchers
Australian National University alumni
ETH Zurich alumni
Identical twins
Living people
Olympic rowers of Switzerland
Rowers at the 1980 Summer Olympics
Swiss emigrants to Australia
Swiss biochemists
Swiss twins
Twin sportspeople
Academic staff of the University of New South Wales
Academic staff of the University of Sydney
Swiss male rowers